Ortizan Solossa (born 28 October 1977 in Sorong, Irian Jaya) is a retired Indonesian footballer.

Club career
Leaving Persipura Jayapura and his homeland Papua in 1999, Ortizan played for PSM Makassar, where he scored in the 2004 AFC Champions League, Persija Jakarta, where he met his brother Boaz in the 2005 Liga Indonesia final (Persija lost 3–2 to Boaz's Persipura) and Arema Malang before coming back to Persipura and finally ending his career at Persiram Raja Ampat.

Ortizan obtained a Bachelor of Economics at Cenderawasih University in 2013.

International career

International goals

Personal life
Ortizan was born into a respectable family in Papua. His uncle, Jacobus Perviddya "Jaap" Solossa, was the 12th Governor of Irian Jaya/Papua Province from 2000 until his death in 2005. Aside from his well-known brother Boaz, his other brother Nehemia was also a footballer.

Honours

Club
PSM Makassar
Liga Indonesia Premier Division (1): 1999–2000

Persipura Jayapura
Indonesia Super League (2): 2008–09, 2010–11
Indonesian Community Shield (1): 2009
Indonesian Inter Island Cup (1): 2011

International
Indonesia
AFF Championship: Runner-up 2004

References

External links
 
 Liga Indonesia
 

1977 births
Living people
Papuan people
People from Sorong
Indonesian Christians
Indonesian footballers
Indonesia international footballers
Indonesian Super League-winning players
Indonesian Premier Division players
Liga 1 (Indonesia) players
PSM Makassar players
Persija Jakarta players
Arema F.C. players
Persipura Jayapura players
Association football midfielders
Cenderawasih University alumni
Sportspeople from Papua